Husbands: The Comic is a digital comic book series published by Dark Horse Comics. The series serves as a canonical continuation of the acclaimed newlywed sitcom Husbands, following the events of its third season, and is written by the television series’ creators Brad Bell and Jane Espenson. The storyline follows Cheeks and Brady after they receive a mysterious wedding present, which sets in motion a chain of events, thematic to the rabbit hole metaphor. It was ultimately collected in a hardcover edition, released on March 27, 2013.

Development
An announcement at the 2012 Dragon Con revealed that an exclusive digital comic book series, based on the newlywed sitcom Husbands, would be released on October 24, 2012, published by Dark Horse Comics, featuring art by Ron Chan, Natalie Nourigat, M. S. Corley, Benjamin Dewey and Tania del Rio. In early 2013, a hardcover edition was released, featuring an introduction by Neil Gaiman.

Jane Espenson explains that "[Husbands] is set in a marriage-equalized world, so it's already got a hint of an alternate-universe thing going on". Reiterating that sentiment, she goes on to say, "the comic books are going to totally dive into a whole [alternate-universe] premise. So we're going from genre-curious to full-on genre!" Brad Bell elaborated, "I wanted to make sure we translated Husbands into something worthy of the comic realm. It’s not some sort of trans-media marketing ploy. I think fans of comics and fans of Husbands will enjoy it". Bell obtained inspiration from the feature film Scott Pilgrim vs. the World, saying that he "thought it was an incredible interpretation of comics on the screen". This developed into an affinity for the comic book writing style.

Espenson and Bell felt that an allegorical examination of the story would lend itself to find aspects of realism in its metaphors, which would give them a framing device to connect the alternate universes, to which Bell continued, "would be a way to explore a bunch of different universes with a bunch of different stories while still connecting it". Espenson determined that, even though "each comic is a discrete adventure", there is "always one or two threads that tie into the larger mythology". In conclusion, she equated its overall paradigm with the type of serialized storytelling employed by the reimagined Battlestar Galactica series.

Publication

Issues

Accolades

References

External links
 Husbands: The Comic at Dark Horse Comics

2012 comics debuts
Comics based on television series
Dark Horse Comics limited series
Fantasy comics